The JT 42CW is a class of six axle Co'Co' diesel electric freight locomotives manufactured by Alstom's Meinfesa plant in Valencia Spain in the late 1990s for use by Israel Railways (IR).

Description
The locomotives are of the Prima type, produced at Alstom's plant in Valencia, Spain in collaboration with GM-EMD; the locomotives use EMD traction equipment and an EMD 710 engine. The units were ordered in 1996 and entered service in 1998.

The locomotives were designed for freight work, but have also been used to haul passenger trains due to a shortage of locomotives.

See also
Israel Railways JT 42BW, contemporary passenger locomotives from the same manufacturer

References

External links

Alstom Prima diesel locomotives
Diesel-electric locomotives of Israel
Macosa/Meinfesa/Vossloh Espana locomotives
Standard gauge locomotives of Israel
Railway locomotives introduced in 1996